Shaswar Abdulwahid (born 2 December 1978 in Slemani, Kurdistan region, is a businessman-turned-politician, leader of Naway Nwe movement and the founder of NRT media.

Media and business empire
In 2007, Abdulwahid established Nalia Company, which first invested in real estate starting with housing projects such as German Village 1, 2, and 3, Nali City, and then others (Kurdcity 1 and 2). Following the success of those projects, he turned into media.  
In 2010, he established Nalia Media Company, which now has four satellite channels in Kurdish NRT News (NRT, NRT2, NRT3, and NRT4). Another channel, NRT Arabic, was also a successful TV station until in October 2019, during the anti-government protests in Baghdad, its offices were ransacked by an armed group and forced off-air. 
In 2013, he launched Chavy Land amusement project in Sulaimani, which is a major tourism hotspot for locals and visitors.
NRT TV NRT News has faced multiple threats including burning down its HQ in Sulaimani in 2011 following the anti-government demonstrations (only three days following its launch).

Kurdistan referendum 2017
Abdulwahid entered politics in 2017, during the Kurdistan Region's independence referendum. Shaswar launched a "No for now" campaign to explain the economic and political risks of a "Yes" vote in the 2017 Kurdistan Region independence referendum, despite being branded a traitor by his political adversaries for voicing concerns held by international community. He called the referendum as "an excuse by Kurdish leaders to remain in power".

New Generation Movement
In 2018, Abdulwahid established the New Generation Movement List to take part in the Iraqi and local parliamentary elections. The List was able to secure four seats in Iraq's Council of Representatives in May 2018 and eight seats in Kurdistan Parliament in the regional elections in September 2018. With these achievements, the New Generation became the fourth largest group amongst 40 political parties in the Kurdistan Parliament.
Abdulwahid has been arrested three times since the referendum in 2017: at the end of 2017, he was accused of inciting demonstrations; in March 2019, he was accused of insulting government employees; and, in May 2019, he was accused of misusing mobile technologies. 
He and his supporters have argued that these arrests were politically motivated, noting that he has had prominent companies, businesses, and TV channels since 2007 but was never arrested until 2017 when he became an influential political player on the side of the opposition. 
Abdulwahid's New Generation now has an outspoken opposition group in the Kurdistan Parliament, which constantly monitors the works of the government and offer serious feedback and criticism on the political system in Iraq and the Kurdistan Region.

Arrest
New Generation Movement leader Shaswar Abdulwahid appeared in court in Sulaimani on 3 March 2019 and arrested after being summoned on charges related to Articles 229 and 434 of the Iraqi penal code. Shaswar had been previously arrested in 2017 for backing protests.
He and his supporters have argued that these arrests were politically motivated, noting that he has had prominent companies, businesses, and TV channels since 2007 but was never arrested until 2017 when he became an influential political player on the side of the opposition.

Assassination attempt
Abdulwahid survived an assassination attempt but was injured in his leg in October 2013 before entering political life. At that time, Abdulwahid said, "I am not a politician or a famous figure in politics in Kurdistan region of Iraq. I have no private connections with any politicians or political parties, the only reason that they wanted to kill me is my ownership of NRT TV, as we have been facing many other terrible events in the past three years".

References

Iraqi Kurdish people
1979 births
University of Sulaymaniyah alumni
Living people